Jere Pöyhönen (born 21 October 1993), known professionally as Käärijä, is a Finnish rapper, singer and songwriter. In 2020, he released his debut album . He is set to represent Finland in the Eurovision Song Contest 2023 with the song "Cha Cha Cha".

Biography 
Pöyhönen grew up in the Ruskeasanta neighbourhood of Vantaa, Greater Helsinki. He discovered his passion for music while learning to play the drums, and started producing music in 2014. His stage name comes from a joke with his friends about gambling, a recurring theme in his music.

Pöyhönen released his music independently until 2017, when he was signed to the record label Monsp Records. He subsequently released the double single "" / "". The following year, he released an extended play, titled . In 2020, his debut album  was released.

His entry "Cha Cha Cha" was co-written with Aleksi Nurmi and Johannes Naukkarinen, and was released on 18 January 2023. At the competition, he finished in first place with a total of 539 points (467 points from the televote and 72 points from the juries), thus becoming the Finnish representative for the contest.

Discography

Extended plays 
 2018 –

Studio albums

Singles

References 

1993 births
Living people
21st-century Finnish male singers
Eurovision Song Contest entrants for Finland
Eurovision Song Contest entrants of 2023
Finnish-language singers
Finnish electronic musicians
Finnish hip hop musicians
Finnish rock musicians
Finnish male singer-songwriters
Finnish rappers
People from Vantaa
Singers from Helsinki
Warner Music Group artists